Acrocercops caenotheta is a moth of the family Gracillariidae. It is known from New South Wales, Australia.

The larvae feed on Telopea speciosissima. They probably mine the leaves of their host plant.

References

caenotheta
Moths of Australia
Moths described in 1880